The Red Bank Armory is a former armory located at 76 Chestnut Street in Red Bank, New Jersey that has been converted to ice rink.

The armory was built in 1914 for Troop B of the National Guard's Red Bank Cavalry and featured a 100x144-foot equestrian riding hall. By the 1950s, it was used to store old tanks.

In 1998 Armory was converted to an ice rink, and is home to the Red Bank Generals,  members of the New Jersey Youth Hockey League.

See also
New Jersey National Guard
National Guard Militia Museum of New Jersey
High school ice hockey in New Jersey
Atlantic City Armory
Jersey City Armory

References

External links 
Wikimapia: Red Bank Armory
Red Bank Armory Ice Complex
RinkAtlas listing for Red Bank Armory
Red Bank Generals

Red Bank, New Jersey
Armories in New Jersey
Sports venues in New Jersey
Buildings and structures in Monmouth County, New Jersey
Tourist attractions in Monmouth County, New Jersey
Ice hockey in New Jersey
Indoor ice hockey venues in the United States
1914 establishments in New Jersey
Sports venues completed in 1998